Fear of Music is the third studio album by American rock band Talking Heads, released on August 3, 1979, by Sire Records. It was recorded at locations in New York City during April and May 1979 and was produced by Brian Eno and Talking Heads. The album reached number 21 on the Billboard 200 and number 33 on the UK Albums Chart. It spawned the singles "Life During Wartime", "I Zimbra", and "Cities".

Fear of Music received favorable reviews from critics. Praise centered on its unconventional rhythms and frontman David Byrne's lyrical performances. The album is often considered one of Talking Heads' best releases and has been featured in several publications' lists of the best albums of all time.

Background
Talking Heads' second album More Songs About Buildings and Food, released in 1978, expanded the band's sonic palette. The record included a hit single, a cover of Al Green's "Take Me to the River", which gained the quartet commercial exposure. In March 1979, the band members played the song on nationwide U.S. music show American Bandstand. In the days after the performance, they decided they did not want to be regarded simply as "a singles machine". 

Talking Heads entered a New York City studio without a producer in the spring of 1979 and rehearsed demo tracks. Musically, the band wanted to expand on the "subtly disguised" disco rhythms present in More Songs About Buildings and Food by making them more prominent in the mixes of new songs. The recording plans were shelved after the quartet was not pleased with the results during the sessions. A decision was taken to rehearse in drummer Chris Frantz's and bassist Tina Weymouth's loft, where the band members had played before they signed to a record label in the mid-1970s. Brian Eno, who had produced their previous full-length release, was called in to help.

Recording and production
On April 22 and May 6, 1979, a sound engineering crew in a Record Plant van parked outside Frantz's and Weymouth's apartment building and ran cables through their loft window. On these two days, Talking Heads recorded the basic tracks with Eno. 

Weymouth later stated that Byrne's sense of rhythm is "insane but fantastic" and that he was key to the band's recording drive during the home sessions. As songs evolved, the performances became easier for the band members. Eno was instrumental in shaping both their sound and recording confidence, and worked on electronic treatments of tracks once they were all crafted. With the song "Mind", Byrne introduced his first use of double-tracking of vocals on an album.

Composition
Fear of Music is largely built on an eclectic mix of disco rhythms, cinematic soundscapes, and conventional rock music elements.

Byrne credits the inspiration for the album, especially "Life During Wartime", to life on Avenue A in the East Village. Instead of incorporating characters in society, as he did on More Songs About Buildings and Food, Byrne decided to place them alone in dystopian situations. Weymouth was initially skeptical of Byrne's new compositions, but the frontman managed to persuade her. 

Album opener "I Zimbra" is an African-influenced disco track and includes background chanting from assistant recording engineer Julie Last. The lyrics are based on a nonsensical poem by Dadaist writer Hugo Ball. The sound of the lyrics, combined with the tribal sound of the song (enhanced by guesting guitar virtuoso Robert Fripp), gave it an "ethnic" style; band member Jerry Harrison has said that this song influenced what the band was to do on their next album, Remain in Light (1980).

"Cities" details a search for the perfect urban settlement to live in and was born out of Talking Heads' preferences for urban homes, especially in Manhattan. "Paper" compares a love affair with a simple piece of paper. In "Life During Wartime", Byrne cast himself an "unheroic urban guerrilla", who renounced parties, survived on basic supplies like peanut butter, and heard rumors about weapons shipments and impromptu graveyards. The character is only connected to the imminent collapse of his civilization. Byrne considered the persona "believable and plausible". "Air" is a protest song against the atmosphere, an idea Byrne does not consider "a joke". Inspired by The Threepenny Opera, the lyricist wanted to create a melancholic and touching track about a person who feels so depressed that even breathing feels painful.

Artwork
The LP sleeve was designed by Harrison. It is completely black and embossed with a pattern that resembles the appearance and texture of diamond plate metal flooring, reflecting the album's urban subject matter. The rest of the artwork was crafted by Byrne and includes heat-sensitive photography created by Jimmy Garcia with the help of Doctor Philip Strax. The final design was one of the nominees for the 1980 Grammy Award for Best Recording Package. Harrison suggested the "ludicrous" title to the band. According to Weymouth, it was accepted because it "fit" with the album's themes and the fact that the quartet was under a lot of stress and pressure when making it.

Promotion and release
After completing Fear of Music, Talking Heads embarked on their first Pacific region tour in June 1979 and played concerts in New Zealand, Australia, Japan, and Hawaii. The album was released worldwide on August 3. 

A U.S. tour to showcase the new material was completed during August 1979. At the time, Byrne told Rolling Stone, "We're in a funny position. It wouldn't please us to make music that's impossible to listen to, but we don't want to compromise for the sake of popularity." The band shared the headliner slots with Van Morrison and the Chieftains at the Edinburgh Festival in September and embarked on a promotional European tour until the end of the year.

Reception

Critical
The album was well received by reviewers. Jon Pareles, writing in Rolling Stone, was impressed with its "unswerving rhythms" and Byrne's lyrical evocations; he concluded, "Fear of Music is often deliberately, brilliantly disorienting. Like its black, corrugated packaging (which resembles a manhole cover), the album is foreboding, inescapably urban and obsessed with texture." John Rockwell of The New York Times suggested that the record was not a conventional rock release, while Stephanie Pleet of the Daily Collegian commented that it showed a positive progression in Talking Heads' musical style. Robert Christgau, writing in The Village Voice, praised the album's "gritty weirdness", but noted that "a little sweetening might help". Richard Cromelin of the Los Angeles Times was impressed with Byrne's "awesome vocal performance" and its nuances and called Fear of Music "a quantum leap" for the band. Tom Bentkowski of New York concluded, "But what makes the record so successful, perhaps, is a genuinely felt anti-elitism. Talking Heads was clever enough to make the intellectual infectious and even danceable."

In retrospective reviews, AllMusic's William Ruhlmann felt that Fear of Music was "an uneven, transitional album", but nonetheless stated that it includes songs that match the quality of the band's best works. In the 1995 Spin Alternative Record Guide, Jeff Salamon called it Talking Heads' most musically varied offering. In a 2003 review, Chris Smith of Stylus Magazine praised Byrne's personas and Eno's stylized production techniques. In The Rough Guide to Rock published the same year, Andy Smith concluded that the album is a strong candidate for the best LP of the 1970s because it is "bristling with hooks, riffs and killer lines".

Commercial
Fear of Music was certified Gold by Recording Industry Association of America on September 17, 1985, after more than 500,000 copies were sold in the U.S.

Accolades
Fear of Music was named as the best album of 1979 by NME, Melody Maker, and the Los Angeles Times. The New York Times included it on its unnumbered shortlist of the 10 best records issued that year. Sounds placed the album at number two on its "Best of 1979" staff list, behind the Specials' eponymous release. It placed fourth in the 1979 Pazz & Jop critics' poll run by The Village Voice, which aggregates the votes of hundreds of prominent reviewers. 

In 1985, NME placed Fear of Music at number 68 on its writers' list of the "All Time 100 Albums". In 1987, Rolling Stone placed it at number 94 on its list of the best albums of the previous 20 years. In 1999, it was included at number 33 on The Guardians list of the "Top 100 Albums That Don't Appear in All the Other Top 100 Albums of All Time". In 2004, Pitchfork featured the record at number 31 on its "Top 100 Albums of the 1970s" list, while in 2005, Channel 4 ranked it at number 76 during its "100 Greatest Albums" countdown. The album was also included in the book 1001 Albums You Must Hear Before You Die.

Track listing

 The original LP issue credited all songs to David Byrne, except "I Zimbra". After complaints from other band members, the credits were changed to the above on later CD issues.
 A limited edition UK LP included a live version of "Psycho Killer" and "New Feeling" from Talking Heads' debut album, Talking Heads: 77, on a bonus 7-inch record.

 The remastered reissue was produced by Andy Zax, with the help of Talking Heads, and was mixed by Brian Kehew.
 The DVD portion of the European reissue contains videos of the band performing "I Zimbra" and "Cities" on German music show Rockpop in 1980.

Personnel
Those involved in the making of Fear of Music were:

Talking Heads
David Byrne – lead vocals, guitar; backing vocals ("I Zimbra")
Jerry Harrison – guitar, backing vocals, keyboards
Tina Weymouth – bass guitar, backing vocals
Chris Frantz – drums

Additional musicians
Brian Eno – treatments; backing vocals ("I Zimbra"), additional vocals
Gene Wilder – congas ("I Zimbra", "Life During Wartime") 
Ari – congas ("I Zimbra", "Life During Wartime")
Robert Fripp – guitar ("I Zimbra")
The Sweetbreathes (Lani Weymouth, Laura Weymouth, Tina Weymouth) – backing vocals ("Air")
Julie Last – backing vocals ("I Zimbra")
Hassam Ramzy – surdo ("I Zimbra")
Abdou M'Boup – djembe, talking drum ("I Zimbra")
Assane Thiam – percussion ("I Zimbra")

The birds on "Drugs" were recorded at Lone Pine Koala Sanctuary, Brisbane, Australia

Technical
Brian Eno – producer
Talking Heads – producers
Rod O'Brian – engineer
Dave Hewitt – engineering crew
Fred Ridder – engineering crew
Phil Gitomer – engineering crew
Kooster McAllister – engineering crew
Joe Barbaria – engineer
Chris Martinez – assistant engineer
Tom Heid – assistant engineer
Neal Teeman – engineer
Julie Last – assistant engineer
Greg Calbi – mastering
Jerry Harrison – cover concept
Jimmy Garcia – thermograph (heat sensitive photo)
Dr. Philip Strax – thermograph
David Byrne – concept
Spencer Drate – cover/inner sleeve typography design

Charts

Certifications and sales

Release history

Footnotes

Bibliography

External links
 Fear of Music lyrics at Rhapsody
 

1979 albums
Talking Heads albums
Albums produced by Brian Eno
Albums produced by David Byrne
Albums produced by Chris Frantz
Albums produced by Jerry Harrison
Albums produced by Tina Weymouth
Albums recorded at Record Plant (New York City)
Sire Records albums
Post-punk albums by American artists